The Chiasmodontidae, snaketooth fishes or swallowers, are a family of deep-sea percomorph fishes, part of the order Trachiniformes, known from oceans worldwide.

Timeline

References
 

 
Trachiniformes
Marine fish families
Taxa named by Theodore Gill